The  is a railway line in Tokyo, Japan. It is the only line operated by the third-sector company Tokyo Waterfront Area Rapid Transit. It connects central Tokyo to the artificial islands of Aomi and Odaiba.

Overview
While not part of the Tokyo subway network (as it was built to JR specifications), the Rinkai Line is fully grade separated and runs underground for nearly 10 km of its 12.2 km distance, going as low as 40 meters below the ground when crossing under the Port of Tokyo. The Shinonome – Shin-Kiba segment (which uses the former Keiyō Freight Line) is elevated.

Station list 
All stations are located in Tokyo. All trains stop at every station on the line.

Rolling stock
 TWR 70-000 series 10-car EMUs (since 1996)
 JR East E233-7000 series 10-car EMUs (since 30 June 2013)

The TWR 70-000 series electric multiple unit (EMU) trains are based at Yashio Depot, which is accessed via a spur located between Tennōzu Isle Station and Tokyo Teleport Station (the spur track also provides access to Tokyo Freight Terminal), while the E233 series trains are based at Kawagoe Depot.

A new train type will be introduced in 2024, replacing the 70-000 series.

Former rolling stock
 JR East 205 series 10-car EMUs (2002–2016)

History
Construction of the line started in 1992, with the eastern end of the line using the right-of-way of the Keiyō Freight Line (abandoned in 1983). The name was officially changed to the Rinkai Line on September 1, 2000. The extension to  opened on March 31, 2001 and the final portion to Osaki on December 1, 2002.

The project ran severely over budget, with an estimated final cost of over ¥440 billion. In 2005, the Rinkai Line's average ridership was 140,000 passengers per day and, in 2006, the line finally registered its first operational profit, although interest payments on ¥389 billion yen in debt have resulted in a consistent net loss since 1991. By comparison, the competing elevated Yurikamome line is profitable, thanks to lower construction expenses, higher ticket prices and popularity among tourists and leisure visitors for its scenic views.

However, the Rinkai Line's ridership has steadily increased since, reaching 200,200 passengers per day in 2010. The ridership is forecast to increase further due to future development planned for the area served by the line.

Station numbering was introduced to all Rinkai Line stations in 2016 with stations being assigned station numbers R01 (Shin-Kiba) and R08 (Osaki).

Operating company

 was founded on March 12, 1991 for the express purpose of constructing and operating the railway line. It is a third-sector company, and, as of 1 April 2013, 91.32% of shares are held by the Tokyo Metropolitan Government, 2.41% by JR East, 1.77% by Shinagawa Ward, 0.70% by Mizuho Bank, 0.46% by MUFG Bank, 0.34% by Sumitomo Mitsui Banking Corporation, and the remaining 3% by 41 other companies.

In spite of its severe financial situation, TWR was discovered to have made a five million yen donation to the Tokyo Metropolitan Government on October 16, 2009 to encourage the city's bid for the 2016 Olympic Games. The company stood to benefit financially if the games were held in Tokyo, as several of the proposed venues were located along the Rinkai Line.

In addition to its ownership and operation of the Rinkai Line, TWR is also involved in real estate and subcontracting/management of station- and building-related design.

Future plans

In August 2014, it was revealed that JR East was in negotiations to buy out the Rinkai Line. This would make it easier to incorporate the line into its plans for a direct line to Haneda Airport as well as providing through services to and from the Keiyo Line.

References

External links

Tokyo Waterfront Area Rapid Transit (official) 

 
Railway lines in Japan
Railway lines in Tokyo
Railway lines opened in 1996
1067 mm gauge railways in Japan
Japanese third-sector railway lines
1500 V DC railway electrification
1996 establishments in Japan